Bendahara Sri Nara Diraja Tun Ali was a Tamil Muslim and the fourth bendahara, or prime minister of the Malaccan Sultanate. He was the penghulu bendahari of Malacca before becoming bendahara. He had allegedly conspired to assassinate the sultan of Malacca, Raja Sri Parameswara Dewa Shah. According to other sources, Tun Ali and his nephew, Raja Kassim was conspiring to murder Raja Rokan who was disliked by palace officials. It was said that during the attack, Raja Rokan who was with Sri Parameswara stabbed the king in retaliation to an attacker stabbing Raja Rokan. Tun Ali and Raja Kassim was unsuccessful to save the king. Tun Ali then installed Raja Kassim as the monarch of Malacca who took the title Sultan Muzaffar Shah. Tun Ali stepped down in 1446 upon the advice of Sultan Muzaffar in favour of Bendahara Paduka Raja Tun Perak.

Grandson
Tun Ali's grandson by Tun Tahir (who shared the same name with him) married Tun Fatimah, the daughter of his second son Bendahara Seri Maharaja Tun Mutahir. Tun Ali was then executed on the order of Sultan Mahmud Shah along with Tun Mutahir after Tun Mutahir was accused of treason by Raja Mudaliar. Sultan Mahmud then married Tun Fatimah.

References

Further reading
Modul Latihan Pengajaran dan Pembelajaran Sejarah, Pusat Perkembangan Kurikulum Kementerian Pendidikan Malaysia.
 Malaysia Kita, International Law Book Services, Kuala Lumpur, 2005

External links
 https://web.archive.org/web/20060413202402/http://sejarahmalaysia.pnm.my/

History of Malacca
People from Malacca
Malaysian Muslims
Malaysian criminals
Malaysian people of Tamil descent
Malaysian people of Indian descent